Peter Haselhurst (born 13 July 1957) is an Australian field hockey player. He competed at the 1984 Summer Olympics in Los Angeles, where the Australian team placed fourth. He became world champion with Australia in 1986.

References

External links

1957 births
Living people
Australian male field hockey players
Olympic field hockey players of Australia
Field hockey players at the 1984 Summer Olympics